The 2011 Fuchs-Silkolene British Supersport Championship season was the 24th running of the British Supersport Championship. The supersport series is made up of 2 classes Supersport and Supersport cup, the cup is for younger competitors who are finding their way into the series. Supersport motorcycles have 600cc engines and are allowed to be tuned, after market parts and racing parts can be added to the bikes to elevate it above the feeder Superstock series. 
For the 2011 season, the Supersport bikes will have two races per meeting for the first time, one on the Saturday which will be 75% of the full race distance and one on Sunday which will be full race distance. Full points will count in both races. 
With 2010 Champion Sam Lowes moving to the World Supersport Championship and runner up James Westmoreland moving up to British Superbike Championship the field was wide open for the returning Alastair Seeley riding the new Suzuki Supersport bike. 
It would turn out to be a battle between Seeley and Ben Wilson throughout the season with tight elbow to elbow racing at all rounds, Seeley would eventually come out on top in the last race of the year to win the Supersport Championship by a single point.

Calendar

Notes:
1. – The second race at Oulton Park was cancelled due to bad weather conditions. As a result, the race was run at the final round of the championship at Brands Hatch, with the second race grid positions standing for the race.

Entry list

Championship standings

Riders' Championship

Privateers' Championship

References

External links
 The official website of the British Supersport Championship

British
Supersport
British Supersport Championship